Prazzo is comune of the province of Cuneo, in Piedmont, northern Italy.

Prazzo is part of local community of the "Valle Maira" valley.

The centre of the commune, containing the nursery and the primary school, a hotel and most of the shops of the village, is located in Prazzo Superiore, while the parish church and an army base, at times used by various corps of the Italian Army and NATO for mountain training, are in Prazzo Inferiore.

Economy
The local economy is based on agriculture, tourism, public offices and ENEL (Italy's main electric energy provider). The only public transport available is a bus service that, from the Cuneo railway station, serves the whole valley up to Acceglio.

Cities and towns in Piedmont
Cittaslow